Cahir Healy (2 December 1877 – 8 February 1970) was an Irish politician.

Background

Born in Mountcharles in County Donegal, Ireland he became a journalist working on various local papers. He joined Sinn Féin on its foundation in 1905.

Anti Partitionist
Healy later became a Anti Partisionist and campaigned against the inclusion of County Fermanagh and County Tyrone into Northern Ireland, arguing that they had Irish nationalist majorities (see Partition of Ireland). With the pending partition of Ireland Healy worked with the cabinet of the southern Irish parliament (Second Dáil) and in 1922 was a member of Michael Collin's special Advisory Committee on the North-East. In August 1921 Healy was part of a Fermanagh nationalist delegation that met with President Éamon de Valera where they made clear their feelings on a Northern Irish Parliament: "Fermanagh by a large majority...resolved that it would not submit to the partition parliament in Ulster." In a letter from Lloyd George to de Valera (dated 7 September 1921) regarding the inclusion of Tyrone and Fermanagh into a new northern state, the British Prime Minister stated that his government had a very weak case on the issue of "forcing these two counties against their will" into Northern Ireland.   

Following the assassination of William J. Twaddell (a Unionist Member of Parliament in Belfast) (22 May 1922) Healy was interned with 300 others under brutal conditions on the prison ship HMS Argenta for eighteen months. Healy is quoted on the reasons for his arrest and internment: "All my life, I have been a man of peace. It is not, therefore, because they feared that I would disturb the peace of Northern Ireland that they dragged me away from my wife and family, but for political reasons. I have been engaged in preparing the case for the inclusion of these areas (Fermanagh and Tyrone) in the Free State. To get me out of the way, local politicians urged my arrest."

Member of the British and Northern Ireland Parliaments
Healy was elected in the 1922 UK general election to represent Fermanagh and Tyrone as a Nationalist Party MP, with the support of Sinn Féin. Healy was re-elected in 1923, but remained in custody until February 1924 and was prohibited from entering the western part of County Fermanagh (he did not defend his seat). In June 1924 Healy pressed the government to compensate the thousands of Northern Ireland citizens that were forced to flee Belfast during serious sectarian rioting/violence (see The Troubles in Northern Ireland (1920–1922)). 
Healy was also elected to the Northern Ireland House of Commons in the 1925 Northern Ireland general election, but did not take his seat until 1927 due to the Nationalist abstentionist policy. In his fight against partition, Healy did not support the use of physical force or abstentionism: "...physical force only consolidates Unionist opinion against us, and result in injury to Catholics as a whole...if abstention is to become a policy...it should be abstention from public boards...as well as refusal to pay rates and taxes. If this policy of civil disobedience is not feasible (and I admit it is not), then abstention from Stormont is just an insincere gesture." In 1928 Healy and the influential nationalist politician Joe Devlin became founder members of the National League of the North which was committed to bringing about Irish reunification through consent and parliamentary means. Whenever Healy or Devlin raised issues relating to Northern Ireland (in both the British and Northern Ireland Parliaments), they were routinely ruled out of order.  In 1929, with the break-up of the large Fermanagh and Tyrone constituency, he switched to sit for the new seat of South Fermanagh. In a 1931 by-election he was again elected for Fermanagh and Tyrone to the British Parliament, but stood down again in 1935. In a 24 April 1934 speech on the floor of the Northern Ireland Parliament Healy made clear his feelings on the ruling Unionist government:

Interned Again, Reelection to British and Northern Ireland Parliaments, Writings and Folklore
Healy was interned again by the United Kingdom government for a year during the Second World War, under Defence Regulation 18B and held in Brixton Prison until December 1942. After the war Healy helped launch the broad based Irish Anti-Partition League which worked to foster public and political opinion against partition in Britain and the United States. Healy also worked with the Labour Party in Britain and helped establish the parliamentary pressure group Friends of Ireland (UK). In 1945 Healy wrote the widely read anti partition pamphlet The Mutilation of a Nation which sold over 10.000 copies. In 1950 he was elected to the British House of Commons for a third time, on this occasion representing Fermanagh and South Tyrone. He finally sat in the British Parliament in 1952 and held the seat until he stood down in 1955. He left the Northern Ireland House of Commons in 1965, by which point he was the Father of the House.

Healy became an insurance official in Enniskillen, County Fermanagh but continued to write, his output including journalism, poetry and short stories. Healy was a correspondent for a number of Irish and American papers, over the years Healy wrote hundreds of historical articles, scripts and plays for the Irish, British and United States media. With a special interest in Irish history and folklore, in the 1960s he was a founder of the Ulster Folk and Transport Museum. Cahir Healy was a leader of northern Irish Nationalists and was a self-educated man who made major contributions to Ireland's cultural and literary heritage. He died on 8 February 1970.

References

External links 
 

1877 births
1970 deaths
Nationalist Party (Ireland) politicians
People detained under Defence Regulation 18B
Members of the Parliament of the United Kingdom for Fermanagh and Tyrone (1922–1950)
Members of the Parliament of the United Kingdom for Fermanagh and South Tyrone (since 1950)
Members of the House of Commons of Northern Ireland 1925–1929
Members of the House of Commons of Northern Ireland 1929–1933
Members of the House of Commons of Northern Ireland 1933–1938
Members of the House of Commons of Northern Ireland 1938–1945
Members of the House of Commons of Northern Ireland 1945–1949
Members of the House of Commons of Northern Ireland 1949–1953
Members of the House of Commons of Northern Ireland 1953–1958
Members of the House of Commons of Northern Ireland 1958–1962
Members of the House of Commons of Northern Ireland 1962–1965
Politicians from County Donegal
UK MPs 1922–1923
UK MPs 1923–1924
UK MPs 1931–1935
UK MPs 1950–1951
UK MPs 1951–1955
Early Sinn Féin politicians
Members of the House of Commons of Northern Ireland for Fermanagh and Tyrone
Members of the House of Commons of Northern Ireland for County Fermanagh constituencies